Leslie Segar also known as "Big Lez", is a dancer, choreographer, radio and television personality, and fitness specialist. She is known as a host of Rap City and as the dancer in the opening credits of Living Single.

Early life and education 
Segar is from Jackson Heights, Queens. As a young teen she was a gymnast.

She has a bachelor's degree in physiology and sport medicine from Springfield College in Springfield, Ma .

Career 
Segar has worked as a dancer, choreographer, on-air radio and television personality, producer, fitness specialist, and actress, and is noted for her athletic style and ability to backflip. Her first audition was for the production of Club XXII, a Hip Hop twist of Shakespeare's Twelfth Night produced by Randy Weiner and Rob Hanning and starring Lauryn Hill, MC Lyte, and Wyclef Jean. She has danced with LL Cool J, Bobby Brown, Salt n' Pepa, Mary J. Blige, Whitney Houston, Michael Jackson, and Michael K. Williams, and was a dancer in the opening credits of Living Single. She is most known for her time on Rap City from 1994 to 1999. Segar has choreographed for Sean Combs on Mary J. Blige's first album.

In 2019, she co-hosted a weekly internet radio show Tha Spin Room.

Personal life 
As of 2020, Segar was living in Los Angeles.

References

Living people
American female dancers
American women choreographers
American choreographers
American actresses
American radio hosts
Springfield College (Massachusetts) alumni
American gymnasts
1967 births